Rodrigo Logan Soto (born 1 February 1980) is a Chilean politician and lawyer.

Biography
Born in Quinta Normal in 1980, Rodrigo is the son of the shoe salesman Enzo Logan and Margarita Soto, an employee of La Polar. he grew up in that commune until he was five when his parents achieved to acquire ―through a subsidy― a house in Recoleta, a commune from which he hasn't moved.

His stay at the school in Recoleta was brief because in fifth grade his parents decided to enroll him at the José Victorino Lastarria Lycee. There, he worked to achieve his goal of studying law at the University of Chile, which he reached in 1998 after a failed attempt in 1997.

In 2016, Logan run for conusilmen of Recoleta and was supported by the centre-rightist party Renovación Nacional.

On 16 May 2021, he was elected as a constituent for the Chilean Constitutional Convention representing his district (N°9) which includes communes like Recoleta and Quinta Normal. Days later, it was reported by CNN Chile that Logan was the most voted constituent of the ninth district.

On 4 July 2021, he obtained five votes in the career for being the Constitutional Convention's vicepresident. One was Bessy Gallardo's.

References

External links
 
 BCN Profile

1980 births
Living people
University of Chile alumni
21st-century Chilean lawyers
Members of the Chilean Constitutional Convention
Party of the People (Chile) politicians